The Taipei Economic and Cultural Office in Macau (TECO) is the representative office of the Republic of China in Macau. Its counterpart body in Taiwan is the Macau Economic and Cultural Office in Taiwan.

The office is located at Dynasty Plaza building in Sé.

History
Until 1967, the Republic of China was represented in Portuguese Macau by the Special Commissariat of the Ministry of Foreign Affairs of the Republic of China. However, following the 12-3 incident in 1966, the Portuguese government agreed to close it down, as well as ban all pro-Kuomintang activities. As a result, the opening of the then Taipei Trade and Tourism Office prompted concerns from the local branch of the Xinhua News Agency, the People's Republic of China's de facto mission in Macau, which threatened to protest to the Macau authorities "if anything went wrong".

In 1989, the Taipei Trade and Tourism Office was opened. In 1999, it was renamed to the Taipei Economic and Cultural Center in Macau. In 2011, it was then renamed to the Taipei Economic and Cultural Office in Macau.

In September 2022, SCMP reported that the government of Macau would stop renewing visas to employees of the office from Taiwan unless they signed a pledge recognizing the one-China principle, similar to what the Hong Kong government had earlier asked Taiwan to do at the Taipei Economic and Cultural Office in Hong Kong. Taiwan's Mainland Affairs Council said the pledge was not part of a 2011 agreement between the governments of Taiwan and Macau, and therefore would not sign the pledge. Taiwan's Mainland Affairs Council owns the Sun Yat Sen Memorial House in Macau, and has anticipated that Beijing will seize the property if no employees from Taiwan are allowed in Macau.

Opening
The official opening of the office under its new current name was unveiled on 19 July 2011 by the Minister of Mainland Affairs Council of the Republic of China Lai Shin-yuan. The renaming however was done prior to the official office launch under the new name on 4 July 2011.

Transportation
In the future, the office will be served from Jardim das Artes Station of the Macau LRT.

See also
 Cross-Strait relations
 Taipei Economic and Cultural Office in Hong Kong
 List of diplomatic missions of Taiwan
 One-China policy

References

External links
  

2011 establishments in Macau
Macau–Taiwan relations
Sé, Macau
Macau
Diplomatic missions in Macau